Kinesin-like protein KIF1B is a protein that in humans is encoded by the KIF1B gene.

Clinical significance
It is associated with Charcot–Marie–Tooth disease, type 2A1.

Interactions
KIF1B has been shown to interact with GIPC1.

References

Further reading

External links
  GeneReviews/NCBI/NIH/UW entry on Charcot-Marie-Tooth Neuropathy Type 2